The Vermont Catamounts represented the University of Vermont in Women's Hockey East Association play during the 2015–16 NCAA Division I women's ice hockey season.

Offseason
July 1: 12 Players named to the WHEA All-Academic Team.

Recruiting

Roster

2015–16 Catamounts

Schedule

|-
!colspan=12 style=""| Regular Season

|-
!colspan=12 style=""| WHEA Tournament

Awards and honors

Taylor Willard named Second Team WHEA All-Star

Miscellaneous

Saana Valkama was named to the 2016 Finnish National Team for the World Championship Tournament.

Sammy Kolowrat was named to the 2016 Czech Republic National Team for the World Championship Tournament

References

Vermont
Vermont Catamounts women's ice hockey seasons
Cata
Cata